Jessie Robins (5 June 1905 – 10 August 1991) was an English actress whose career lasted from 1958 to 1974. She was best recognised as Ringo Starr's "Auntie Jessie"  in The Beatles' made-for-television movie Magical Mystery Tour and as the innkeeper's wife in Roman Polanski's The Fearless Vampire Killers.

Work
Her television and film work includes:

References

External links
 

1905 births
1991 deaths
English film actresses
English television actresses
20th-century English actresses